Thomas Frost (born March 7, 1925) is a multiple Grammy Award-winning classical music producer, who won many of his awards for producing the albums of Vladimir Horowitz. Frost is the father of producer David Frost.

His Grammy wins include:

1966, Best Classical Album for Horowitz at Carnegie Hall - An Historic Return.
1972, Best Classical Album for Horowitz Plays Rachmaninoff (Etudes-Tableaux Piano Music; Sonatas), with Richard Killough.
1978, Best Classical Album for Concert of the Century, with Leonard Bernstein (conductor), Dietrich Fischer-Dieskau, Vladimir Horowitz, Yehudi Menuhin, Mstislav Rostropovich, Isaac Stern, Lyndon Woodside and the New York Philharmonic.
1987, Best Classical Album for Horowitz - The Studio Recordings, New York 1985.
1988, Best Classical Album for Horowitz in Moscow, as well as an award Classical Producer of the Year.
2003 award for Best Instrumental Soloist(s) Performance (with orchestra)  for Brahms/Stravinsky: Violin Concertos, with Richard King (engineer), Neville Marriner (conductor), Hilary Hahn and the Academy of St. Martin in the Fields.

References

External links
David Dubal interview with Thomas Frost, WNCN-FM, 18-Dec-1981

Grammy Award winners
Living people
1925 births
Classical music producers